Vancouver Burrards Senior Lacrosse Club has been the name of several lacrosse teams in Vancouver, British Columbia, Canada. Currently, the Club consists of three teams in Senior B, Senior C, and Intermediate B lacrosse; the Junior B team suspended operations for the 2007 season. There is no affiliation between the current Vancouver Burrards teams and the WLA Burrards now located in Maple Ridge.

Due to arena availability in the City of Vancouver leading up to the 2010 Winter Olympics, the Senior B Burrards were forced out of their home arena at Killarney Community Centre after the 2006 season and moved to the Burnaby Lake arena. This resulted in the 2007 season becoming the first lacrosse season since 1928 in which no senior men's summer lacrosse was played within the City of Vancouver.

Senior A 1937–1993
Former Senior 'A' team which joined the Inter-City Lacrosse League in 1937. The team played in the Western Lacrosse Association until 1993 when the team was transferred to Surrey. Two years later the Surrey Burrards moved to their current home in Maple Ridge.

During the team's existence in Vancouver, it underwent numerous name changes to reflect sponsorship and merging with other teams.

 1937–1937 Vancouver Burrard Olympics
 1938–1949 Vancouver Burrards
 1950–1950 Vancouver Burrard Westerns
 1951–1951 Vancouver Combines
 1952–1958 Vancouver Pilseners
 1959–1969 Vancouver Carlings
 1970–1993 Vancouver Burrards

In the early days, the Vancouver Forum on the PNE grounds was used as the home arena until Kerrisdale Arena was built on the west side of the city in 1949. In May 1990, the Burrards left Kerrisdale Arena and moved to the PNE Agridome, playing there until departing for Surrey four seasons later.

HISTORY - UNDER CONSTRUCTION

The Burrard Olympics were founded in 1937 by Les Dickinson, Bill Calder, and Ed Bayley of the Burrard Liberal Association – however the team almost never got out of the starting gate due to a player signing dispute between the Richmond Farmers, Vancouver Home Gas and the newly formed Burrards. Three days before their Inter-City Lacrosse League season opener on May 1, 1937, a solution was found which saw the Richmond Farmers and Vancouver Home Gas teams merged into one combined squad.

The Burrard Olympics finished their inaugural season in last place and were renamed the Vancouver Burrards the following season, although in those early days the nickname Burrard Bombers or Blue Bombers was often heard and seen in the press. The Burrards improved to finish in third-place in the 5-team league with a winning record but then fell to the New Westminster Salmonbellies 15-11 and 12–10 in the first round of playoffs.

1939 saw the Burrards took first place during the regular season by 2 points but then lose again in the first-round of playoffs, this time 20–4 in game seven to the New Westminster Adanacs.

Vancouver Burrards won the Inter-City Lacrosse League regular season for the second year in a row in 1940. This time for the post-season, they secured a bye to the league finals and then swept the New Westminster Adanacs in four games. The Burrards then brushed aside the Rossland Red Men in two games to win the Kilmarnock Cup, symbolic of the senior champion of British Columbia. Vancouver then travelled eastwards to meet the Cornwall Braves in the Dominion semi-finals, easily handling their opposition in 2 lopsided games. Making their first Mann Cup appearance, the Burrards won the opening game 14-9 versus the St. Catharines Athletics before losing the next three games 15–5, 17–10, and 18–5.

Inter-City Lacrosse League (ICLL) 1937–1967

National Lacrosse Association (NLA) 1968

Western Lacrosse Association (WLA) 1969–1993

Team Record

Senior B (1999-2007)
West Coast Senior Lacrosse Association (WCSLA) franchise from 1989 to 2007. Team moved to Burnaby prior to the start of the 2007 season and renamed Burnaby Burrards the following year.

Governors
 Terry Kirstiuk (2001–2007)
 Shawn Joinson (2008–present)

Managers
 Terry Kirstiuk (2001–2006)
 Shawn Joinson (2007–present)

Head coaches
 Dan Rodrigues (2001)
 Marc Olimpo (2002–2004)
 Dan Rodrigues (2005)
 Tony Delmonico (2007–2010)

Team Record

Senior C
West Central Lacrosse League (WCLL) franchise established in 2003 as the Vancouver Vipers. In October 2005 during the off-season, Vancouver's executive decided to rename the team the Burrards to keep in line with all other Vancouver box lacrosse teams from minor up through to senior level.

Team Executive

 Terry Kirstiuk (governor / team manager) 2003–2004, 2008–present
 Terry Kirstiuk (governor) 2005-2007
 Dave Stewart-Candy (team manager) 2005-2007

Team Record

Junior A

In 1948 Vancouver Burrards defeated the St. Catharines Athletics 3 games to 2 (13-17, 10–4, 10–9, 10–13, 12–10) for the Minto Cup, Canadian Junior National Championship.

Junior B
Team Record

Intermediate B
Team Record

Retired Numbers
The following players have had their jersey numbers retired by the WLA Burrards club. The Senior B and Senior C Burrards also pay respect to these numbers and avoid using them as well.

1 - Walt Lee
1 - Jack Green
2 - Don Hamilton
5 - John Cavallin
14 - Harry Buchanan
18 - Bill Chisholm
21 - Roy Cavallin
29 - Dave Evans

Burr